Robotniczy Klub Sportowy Raków Częstochowa Spółka Akcyjna (commonly referred to as Raków Częstochowa, or simply Raków) is a Polish professional football club, based in Częstochowa, that competes in the Ekstraklasa, the top tier of national football league system.

History 

Sports club "Racovia" was established in 1921 in the village of Raków. The club dissolved in 1925 due to lack of registration. In 1927, the club was reactivated under the name of the Robotniczy Klub Sportowy (Workers Sports Club) Raków. A year later, the village became a district of Częstochowa. The club operated under the patronage of the Polish Socialist Party and was financially supported by the Częstochowa steelworks. In 1937 the club was promoted to class A. During the German occupation (World War II), the club did not function. In the years 1951-1955 a football stadium with an athletics track was built. In the years 1962-1966 the football team played in the second league. On July 9, 1967, Raków lost 0-2 with Wisła Kraków in the Polish Cup final. In 1972, Raków's players reached the semi-finals of the Polish Cup, which they lost to Legia Warsaw. In the years 1978-1980, 1981-1984 and 1990-1994 the club played in the second league. In 1993, the junior team took 2nd place in the Football Junior Championships of Poland. In 1994, for the first time in club history, Raków were promoted to the first league. It played in the top-flight for four seasons until being relegated in 1997–98. The club suffered back-to-back relegations in 1999–2000 and 2000–01, dropping down to the IV liga. The club finally made it to back to the Polish second division, I liga, in 2016.

Promotion and European football 
The club won the I liga in 2018–19, earning promotion to the Ekstraklasa in advance of the 2019–20 season for the first time in 21 years. In the same season, they impressed in the 2018-19 Polish Cup, reaching the semi finals of the competition by beating the likes of Lech Poznań in the round of 32 and Legia Warsaw in the quarter finals. They finished in 10th place in the 2019-20 season.

In the 2020–21 season, Raków Częstochowa finished in second place in the league. This was their highest ever league position in their history, and it secured their place in the newly formed UEFA Europa Conference League qualifiers for the 2021–22 season, their maiden appearance in European football.  Further success followed when Raków won its first major trophy on 2 May 2021, defeating I liga side Arka Gdynia in the final of the Polish Cup by a score of 2–1. On 17 July 2021, Raków Częstochowa defeated reigning Ekstraklasa title holders Legia Warsaw in penalties in the Polish Super Cup.

Their first ever appearance in European football was in the second qualifying round of the 2021–22 UEFA Europa Conference League, facing Lithuanian team Sūduva, with the game finishing 0–0 (4-3 pens) after both legs. They faced Russian Premier League side Rubin Kazan in the third qualifying round, beating them 1–0 on aggregate score. In the final qualifying round, they faced Belgian side Gent, which they beat 1–0 in the first leg, but lost 0–3 in the second leg, losing 1–3 on aggregate, eliminating them from the competition.

On 2 May 2022, Raków defeated Lech Poznań 3–1 and secured its second consecutive Polish Cup. In the race for the league title that season, Raków lost out to the same opponents by just five points, with the champions being decided on the penultimate day of the season. On 9 July 2022, Raków won their second consecutive Polish Super Cup with a 2–0 win over Lech Poznań.

Players and pupils 

The club's pupils are Jakub Błaszczykowski, Jerzy Brzęczek and Jacek Magiera. The players were, among others, Jacek Krzynówek and Tomasz Kiełbowicz.

Current squad

Out on loan

Other players under contract

Notable players
Players who have either appeared for their respective national team at any time. 
Players whose name is listed in bold represented their countries while playing for Raków.

Poland

 Adam Fedoruk
 Michał Gliwa
 Jarosław Jach
 Tomasz Kiełbowicz
 Jacek Krzynówek
 Hubert Pala
 Kamil Piątkowski
 Michał Skóraś
 Paweł Skrzypek
 Maciej Wilusz
 Mateusz Zachara

Europe

 Armenia
 Aghvan Papikyan
 Belarus
 Artsyom Rakhmanaw
 Croatia
 Fran Tudor
 Czech Republic
 Tomáš Petrášek
 Georgia
 Valerian Gvilia
Greece
 Giannis Papanikolaou
 Stratos Svarnas
 Latvia
 Vladislavs Gutkovskis
 Romania
 Deian Sorescu
 Serbia
 Marko Poletanović
 Slovenia
 David Tijanić
 Sweden
 Gustav Berggren
 Ukraine
 Vladyslav Kocherhin

Central America

Costa Rica
 Felicio Brown Forbes

Honours

League
Ekstraklasa
Runners-up: 2020–21, 2021–22
I liga (second division)
Winners: 1993–94, 2018–19
II liga (third division)
Winners: 1962, 1977–78, 1980–81, 1989–90, 2016–17
III liga (fourth division)
Winners: 1936–37, 1956, 2004–05

Cups
Polish Cup
Winners: 2020–21, 2021–22
Runners-up: 1966–67
Polish Super Cup
Winners: 2021, 2022

Raków Częstochowa in European football

Results

UEFA Team ranking

'''As of 12 August 2022.

Coaches and managers

 Franciszek Karmański ( – 1959)
 Jerzy Orłowski (1959-1960)
 Władysław Siech (1962)
 Czesław Suszczyk (1962 – 1964)
 Leon Wolny (1964)
 Edward Drabiński (1964 – 1965)
 Henryk Bobula (1965 – 1966)
 Jan Basiński (1966)
 Jerzy Wrzos (1966 - 1967)
 Jan Basiński ( - 1977)
 Janusz Poniedziałek (1977 – 1979)
 Zbigniew Szumski (1979 – 1980)
 Jan Basiński (1980 – 1984)
 Zbigniew Dobosz (1984 – 1985)
 Gothard Kokott (Jul 1, 1985 – Jan 1, 1986)
 Jan Basiński (1990 – 1991)
 Władysław Szarżyński (1991 – 1992)
 Zbigniew Dobosz (1992 – March 1995)
 Gothard Kokott (March 1995 – April 23, 1997)
 Hubert Kostka (April 24, 1997 – Sept 15, 1997)
 Jan Basiński (Sept 16, 1997 – Oct 1, 1997)
 Bogusław Hajdas (Oct 2, 1997 – Nov 3, 1997)
 Adam Zalewski (Nov 4, 1997 – Dec 1, 1997)
 Gothard Kokott (Dec 2, 1997 – Jul 1, 1998)
 Zbigniew Dobosz (1998 – 2000)
 Mirosław Sieja (2000 – July 2000)
 Adam Zalewski (July 2000 – 2000)
 Henryk Turek (2000 – )
 Zbigniew Dobosz (2002 – 2003)
 Andrzej Samodurow (2003 – Oct 17, 2005)
 Robert Olbiński (Oct 17, 2005 – Aug 20, 2008)
 Henryk Turek (2008 – Aug 20, 2008)
 Leszek Ojrzyński (Aug 20, 2008 – Oct 9, 2009)
 Robert Olbiński (Oct 19, 2009 – Feb 9, 2010)
 Jerzy Brzęczek (Feb 9, 2010 – Nov 4, 2014)
 Dawid Jankowski (Nov 6, 2014 – Dec 18, 2014)
 Radosław Mroczkowski (Dec 18, 2014 – Oct 3, 2015)
 Krzysztof Kołaczyk (Oct 4, 2015 – Oct 9, 2015)
 Przemysław Cecherz (Oct 9, 2015 – April 18, 2016)
 Marek Papszun (April 18, 2016 – current)

References

External links

 
 Unofficial website 
 Raków Częstochowa at 90minut.pl 

Football clubs in Silesian Voivodeship
Association football clubs established in 1921
1921 establishments in Poland